Videos After Dark is an American video clip television special created by Vin Di Bona, and hosted by Bob Saget on ABC.

The show, which aired on March 12, 2019, was billed as "a special first-look episode" of a series, with more episodes planned to be broadcast "later in the year", but as of June 2021, the series premiere remains the only airing. The series would have been a spin-off of America's Funniest Home Videos, the first since 1996's short-lived World's Funniest Videos. Saget served as the original host of America's Funniest Home Videos, from 1989 to 1997. Videos After Dark would have featured video clips from Di Bona's "vast video vault that are more appropriate for an older audience".

See also
 America's Funniest Home Videos
 Australia's Naughtiest Home Videos

References

External links
 Videos After Dark on ABC
 
  Videos After Dark on The Futon Critic

2019 American television series debuts
2019 American television series endings
2010s American video clip television series
American Broadcasting Company original programming
English-language television shows
Television series by Disney–ABC Domestic Television
American television spin-offs
Reality television spin-offs